Creek Road Bridge is a covered bridge spanning Conneaut Creek in Conneaut, Ashtabula County, Ohio, United States. The bridge, one of currently 16 drivable bridges in the county, is a single span Town truss design.

History
The bridge's date of construction is unknown; it was renovated in 1994.

Dimensions
Length: 
Overhead clearance: 
Underclearance:

Gallery

See also
List of Ashtabula County covered bridges

References

External links

Ohio Covered Bridges List
Ohio Historic Bridge Association

Covered bridges in Ashtabula County, Ohio
Road bridges in Ohio
Wooden bridges in Ohio
Lattice truss bridges in the United States
Conneaut, Ohio